"I Can't Help Myself" is a song co-written and recorded by American country music artist Eddie Rabbitt. Even Stevens shares a co-writing credit.
It was released in April 1977 as the first single from the album Rabbitt.  The song reached number 2 on the Billboard Hot Country Singles & Tracks chart.

Chart performance

References

1977 singles
1977 songs
Eddie Rabbitt songs
Song recordings produced by David Malloy
Songs written by Eddie Rabbitt
Songs written by Even Stevens (songwriter)
Elektra Records singles